Elephant Butte Lake State Park is a state park of New Mexico, United States, located  north of Truth or Consequences along the shore of Elephant Butte Reservoir in Sierra County.

Description
The park is the largest state park in New Mexico and surrounds the state's largest reservoir.

Named after a rock formation resembling an elephant, Recreation at Elephant Butte Reservoir is managed by the New Mexico State Parks under agreement with the United States Bureau of Reclamation. Elephant Butte Dam,  Crews began construction on the dam in 1911 and ended in 1916. This was a major engineering feat in its day. The enormous concrete dam is the major feature of the Elephant Butte National Register Historic District. New Mexico State Parks operates a visitor center that contains information on the construction of the dam.  There are 3 developed camps on the lake, with over 200 camping and picnicking sites, concession-operated marinas, and stores.

Although the park is named after an elephant-shaped butte located at the head of the dam, an actual stegomastodon fossil was discovered there on June 9, 2014. The dam serves as a way to ease flooding, control irrigation and provide electricity. Talk of a dam began in the 1880s after farmers in southern New Mexico, Texas and Mexico began to complain that they were not receiving their fair share of water. A legal battle over the water and where the dam should be built delayed its construction. The dam would get a few more names before the elephant took up permanent residence.

In the late 1800s, local newspapers were already referring to the area where the dam would eventually be built as Elephant Butte. Upper Town was designated for what was considered the higher class and more skilled workers including engineers, and supervisors.(There was even further segregated with Mexicans and Americans separated into different areas.  In 2019, a 9-year-old boy caught a 42-pound blue catfish there.

See also
 List of New Mexico state parks

References

External links

 Elephant Butte Lake State Park
 Elephant Butte Chamber of Commerce information for visitors 

State parks of New Mexico
Parks in Sierra County, New Mexico
Protected areas established in 1964
Rio Grande